Admiral Sir Lindsay Sutherland Bryson  (22 January 1925 – 24 March 2005) was a Scottish Royal Navy officer who went on to be Controller of the Navy.

Naval career
The son of James McAuslan Bryson and Margaret Whyte, Bryson was born and raised in Glasgow, where he was educated at Allan Glen's School. Bryson joined the Royal Navy in 1942. He served during World War II as an engineering cadet. He commanded the naval engineering training school, HMS Daedalus, and then led the Royal Navy's guided weapons programmes from 1973. He was appointed Controller of the Navy in 1981 and served in that role during the Falklands War retiring in 1984.

After leaving the Navy he served in 1985 as President of the Institution of Electrical Engineers and as president of the Association for Project Management 1991–95. He was Deputy Chairman of GEC-Marconi from 1987 to 1990. He was appointed Lord Lieutenant of East Sussex and Brighton and Hove in 1989.

Family
In 1951, he married Averil Curtis-Willson; they had a son and two daughters, one of whom is the actress Ann Bryson. Lady Bryson died in January 2017.

References

1925 births
2005 deaths
Royal Navy officers
Royal Navy admirals
Knights Commander of the Order of the Bath
Lord-Lieutenants of East Sussex
People educated at Allan Glen's School
Military personnel from Glasgow